Happy Hearts is a 2007 Philippine romantic-comedy film. Directed by Joel Lamangan, it stars Shaina Magdayao and Rayver Cruz.

Cast
Shaina Magdayao as Kristine
Rayver Cruz as Alvin
Bebe Gandanghari as Enrico
Wendell Ramos as Louie
Jean Garcia as Sarah
Tirso Cruz III as Mr. Ricafuente
Giselle Sanchez as Tweety
Jill Yulo as Margot
Alwyn Uytingco as Miggy

External links
 Happy Hearts Official Website
 Happy Hearts on IMDB

2007 films
Philippine romantic comedy films
2000s Tagalog-language films
Regal Entertainment films
Films directed by Joel Lamangan
2000s English-language films